Roger Manuel (born 10 November 1988) in the Cook Islands is a footballer who played as a midfielder for Tupapa Maraerenga in the Cook Islands Round Cup and the Cook Islands national football team.

References

1988 births
Living people
Cook Islands international footballers
Association football midfielders
Cook Island footballers